Animals at Work, also called Frisky Business, is a British-Canadian children's television series presented by John Barrowman on CITV. CBBC from 2009 and for Series 3-4., Discovery Channel, and Primo TV.
Each episode features 3 or 4 animals in different parts of the world that do weird jobs.

Episode Transmission Dates:

Series 1 - 25 January 2005 to 19 April 2005 CITV on ITV1

Series 2 - 5 January 2006 to 30 March 2006 CITV on ITV1

Series 3 - 22 July 2010 to 7 October 2010 CBBC on BBC1

Series 4 - 9 June 2011 to 11 August 2011 CBBC on BBC1

Legal conflict
In 2012, Merrily Weisbord, who originated the show Dogs with Jobs, sued Cineflix and series producer Glen Salzman in Quebec Superior Court for $400,000 over Animals at Work. Weisbord alleged that the program was a knockoff or sequel of Dogs with Jobs, having the same structure and featuring at least 15 of the same dogs.

References

External links
 Episode list

2000s Canadian children's television series
2000s British children's television series
Television series about animals